Vice Admiral Sir Paul Lambert,  (born 17 November 1954) is a former Royal Navy officer who served as Deputy Chief of the Defence Staff (Equipment Capability) from 2009 to 2012.

Naval career
Educated at Kettering Grammar School and City University London, Lambert joined the Royal Navy in 1974. He was appointed Commanding Officer of the frigate  in 1996. Promoted to rear admiral, he was appointed Commander Operations and Rear Admiral, Submarines in 2004. He went on to be Capability Manager (Precision Attack) and Controller of the Navy in 2007, and Deputy Chief of the Defence Staff (Equipment Capability) in 2009. In September 2009, he strongly defended the equipment, including helmet and body armour, being issued to military personnel in Afghanistan. Lambert was advanced to Knight Commander of the Order of the Bath in the 2012 New Year Honours.

Retirement
In retirement, Lambert became Secretary General of the Venerable Order of Saint John. He was appointed Knight of the Order of St John (KStJ) in January 2018.

References

|-

|-

1954 births
Knights Commander of the Order of the Bath
Living people
Royal Navy vice admirals
Alumni of City, University of London
Alumni of Darwin College, Cambridge